S.W.A.T. is an American action/crime drama television series about the adventures of a Special Weapons And Tactics (S.W.A.T.) team operating in an unidentified Californian city, although filming was done in and around Los Angeles. A spin-off of The Rookies, the series aired for two seasons on ABC from February 1975 to April 1976. Aaron Spelling and Leonard Goldberg were executive producers. It was created by Robert Hamner and developed by Rick Husky.

S.W.A.T. stars Steve Forrest as the unit's leader, Lt. "Hondo" Harrelson, Robert Urich as Officer Jim Street, Rod Perry as Sgt. David "Deacon" Kay, Mark Shera as Officer Dominic Luca, and James Coleman as Officer T.J. McCabe. The opening theme was composed by Barry De Vorzon.

The pilot for the series was a two-part episode of The Rookies titled "S.W.A.T." (February 17, 1975).

Synopsis
The series is known for its instrumental theme song composed by Barry De Vorzon which became a number-one hit single in 1976 for Rhythm Heritage. The title sequence that used that piece was also familiar with the principal characters responding to a muster signal, grabbing their weapons and running to their specially equipped transport van driven by "Sam", an uncredited, non-speaking role.

The show's setting was rarely, if ever, specified and the shoulder patch the team members wore on their uniforms said, "W.C.P.D."  Richard Kelbaugh, a former member of the LAPD's S.W.A.T. team, was the technical advisor for the series. WCPD stood for Western California Police Department.

Cast

 Steve Forrest as Lt. Dan "Hondo" Harrelson (team leader)
 Robert Urich as Officer Jim Street
 Rod Perry as Sgt. David "Deacon" Kay
 Mark Shera as Officer Dominic Luca
 James Coleman as Officer Travis Joseph "T.J." McCabe (scout/sniper)
 Ellen Weston as Betty Harrelson  (recurring role)
 Rose Marie as Hilda (recurring role)
 Richard O'Brien as Chief Roman (recurring role)

Episodes

Broadcast and syndication
On October 1, 2011, S.W.A.T. began airing on Antenna TV for a period of time and in Australia on 7mate in 2012. In May 2016, it began airing on getTV. In December 2021, it aired on Rewind TV.  

The series occasionally airs in weekend binges on the OTA network Decades.

Home media

DVD
The first season of S.W.A.T. was released on DVD on June 3, 2003 to tie in with the release of the feature film. Season Two's episode "Time Bomb" was actually produced for Season One and, as such, "Time Bomb" is Episode 8 on the Season One DVD set. The Season One DVD set has a total of 13 episodes.

On February 10, 2012, it was announced that Shout! Factory had acquired the rights to the series; they subsequently released the second and final season on DVD on May 22, 2012.

On January 16, 2018, Mill Creek Entertainment released S.W.A.T.: The Complete Series on DVD in Region 1.

Streaming
As of March 2009, the show can be purchased on iTunes.

Reception
The violent television series premiered at a time when violence on television began to become a subject of controversy, and the actual Los Angeles SWAT team on which the fictional team had been modeled was harshly critical of its depiction of such teams.

Film adaptation
A film version of the series, S.W.A.T., was released in 2003 starring Colin Farrell and Samuel L. Jackson. Steve Forrest has a cameo role as a police truck driver and Rod Perry (the original TV series' "Deacon" Kay) plays the father of LL Cool J's character Deacon "Deke" Kaye.

In 2011 and 2017, a direct-to-DVD sequels titled S.W.A.T.: Firefight and S.W.A.T.: Under Siege were released; they bore little connection to the TV series, the 2003 film or even each other.

Television series remake
On May 12, 2017, a new version of S.W.A.T. starring Shemar Moore as Hondo was ordered to series by CBS. The new series premiered on November 2, 2017.

References

External links
 
 

S.W.A.T. (franchise)
1970s American crime drama television series
1975 American television series debuts
1976 American television series endings
American action television series
American Broadcasting Company original programming
English-language television shows
Fictional portrayals of the Los Angeles Police Department
Television series by Sony Pictures Television
Television series by Spelling Television
Television shows adapted into films
Television shows set in Los Angeles
American television spin-offs